Brian Andrew Pickworth (10 August 1929 – 16 December 2020) was a New Zealand fencer.

Biography
Pickworth won the bronze medal as part of the men's sabre team at the 1962 British Empire and Commonwealth Games. His teammates in the event were Bob Binning and Michael Henderson. He competed individually and in teams in the sabre, épée and foil at the 1958, 1962, 1966, and 1970 Commonwealth Games. He competed at the 1960 Summer Olympics in all three disciplines.

References

1929 births
2020 deaths
New Zealand male épée fencers
Fencers at the 1958 British Empire and Commonwealth Games
Fencers at the 1962 British Empire and Commonwealth Games
Fencers at the 1966 British Empire and Commonwealth Games
Fencers at the 1970 British Commonwealth Games
Commonwealth Games bronze medallists for New Zealand
Olympic fencers of New Zealand
Fencers at the 1960 Summer Olympics
Commonwealth Games medallists in fencing
New Zealand male foil fencers
New Zealand male sabre fencers
Medallists at the 1962 British Empire and Commonwealth Games